Meppen (Northern Low Saxon: Möppen) is a town in and the seat of the Emsland district of Lower Saxony, Germany, at the confluence of the Ems, Hase, and Nordradde rivers and the Dortmund–Ems Canal (DEK).  The name stems from the word Mappe, meaning "delta".

Geography
The town lying on the mouth of the Hase into the Ems in the central part of the Emsland between the cities of Lingen and Papenburg.
The population was 34,196 as of 30 June 2005.

Quarters of Meppen:

Following villages are situated in Meppen:
In 1974, 13 independent municipalities in the close vicinity of the town were integrated into Meppen.

History

Meppen, formerly a fortified town, boasts 12 centuries of history. The first documented mention of Meppen dates from 834, in a deed of donation by Frankish emperor Louis the Pious, transferring a missionary establishment of that name to the abbey of Corvey.

945 -- Emperor Otto the Great grants the town the rights to mint coins and collect tolls, followed in 946 by market rights.

1252—Countess Jutta von Vechta-Ravensberg sells her possessions to the Bishop of Münster. Meppen becomes part of the Niederstift Münster (i.e. Lower Prince-Bishopric of Münster).

1360—Meppen is granted the right to build city fortifications by Bishop Adolf of Münster, and thereby, town rights. Over the next three centuries until 1660, Meppen is built up as a fortified town.

1762—at the end of the Seven Years' War, the fortifications are demolished. Some walls remain standing today, however.

1803—Resolutions of the Reichsdeputationshauptschluss assign Meppen to Louis Engelbert, 6th Duke of Arenberg, to compensate for the loss of his possessions on the west bank of the Rhine. Meppen becomes the capital of the dukedom of Arenberg.

1811—Meppen is incorporated into the First French Empire as a cantonal seat.

1813–1814—Occupation by Prussia.

1814–1815—Resolutions of the Congress of Vienna assign Meppen and the Duchy of Arenberg to the Kingdom of Hanover.

1855—Meppen connected to the Hannoverschen Westbahn railway line upon its opening.

1866—Hanover becomes a province of Prussia.

1871—Part of the German Empire.

1938—Kristallnacht: the German police and SA broke down into Jewish houses and carried out mass arrests, beatings and tortures of Jews. Germans burned down the synagogue and destroyed Jewish homes and enterprises. Some Jews were deported to the Oranienburg concentration camp.

1939—German prisoner-of-war camp Stalag VI-B established in Meppen-Versen, in which initially around 5,000 Polish prisoners of war were held after the German invasion of Poland, which started World War II, and then from 1940 to 1942 French, Belgian, Polish, Soviet and other POWs were held there.

1943—Italian prisoners of war brought by the Germans to the Stalag VI-B.

1944—Stalag VI-B converted into a subcamp of the Neuengamme concentration camp. Over 1,700 men were imprisoned there and used as forced labour, and over 20% of them died.

1945—Prisoners of the subcamp were evacuated by the Germans to Bremen, most in a death march, in which at least 50 prisoners died, sick ones by train, and then they were mostly transported to the Neuengamme concentration camp.

1946—The state of Prussia is abolished after the World War II. Meppen becomes part of the newly created Land of Lower Saxony.

1977—District reforms in Lower Saxony unite the former districts of Lingen, Meppen and Aschendorf-Hümmling in the district of Emsland, with Meppen as administrative seat.

Culture and sights

Theatre
Between September and April the Meppen Theatre Group (Theatergemeinde Meppen) offers a comprehensive programme. Productions take place in the Meppen Theatre and Concert Hall, which was designed by Eberhard Kulenkampff and completed in 1959. It also acts as a school hall for the Windthorst Gymnasium. The programme includes both touring theatre productions as well as musical events of various genres.

From May to September, the Emsland Open Air Stage at Meppen (Emsländische Freilichtbühne Meppen) offers visitors a family musical and an evening event, mostly based on musical productions. More than 30,000 visitors come each year to the open air theatre in Esterfeld Forest to see large musical performances involving casts of up to 100.

Museums
 Town Museum in the Arenberg Rentei in Obergerichtsstraße, built by August Reinking
 Exhibition Centre for the Archaeology of the Emsland on Koppelschleuse street
 Art exhibitions in the arts centre on Koppelschleuse street

Buildings
 Around 1461–62 the Priory Church of St. Vitus was built as a three-aisled late Gothic hall church. Whilst there were only wooden churches in the surrounding area, at this sport there was already a simple stone building as early as the 9th century. This was expanded in the 11th century; the heart of the present tower being one of the additions. Further expansion in the 13th century resulting in the Bridle and North Portals being built.
 The Residenz, which today houses the council and the headmaster's office of the Windthorst Gymnasium, was built between 1726 and 1729. Later, in 1743–46, the Gymnasium Church was built onto the Residenz under the Pater Superior, Karl Immendorf.
 The town hall (Rathaus), today the symbol of the town, was constructed in 1408 from glacial erratics. From 1601 to 1605 it was considerably expanded and an additional brick storey added. In order to increase the floor area for the upper storey, an open arched hall was erected in front of the building. The stepped gable with its semi-circular elements was heavily based on Münster prototypes at (Rothenburg 44, built 1583, and the Krameramtshaus of 1589). At the start of the 19th century the building appears to have fallen considerably into disrepair, because the Arenberg architect, Josef Niehaus, was invited by the town submit an assessment for its renovation. He recommended that the ruined tower was demolished and the ornamentation of the gable removed, but initially that came to nought. In 1885 the ornamentation was finally removed and the gable end furnished with a plain triangular gable. In addition the turret of the staircase tower at the side, added in 1611 was demolished due to its poor condition. In 1909 it was decided to rebuild the tower and gable in their present form. Inside the building is a 1605 sandstone fireplace.
 The armoury (Zeughaus) was built in 1752 on the site of the former castle, the Paulsburg (residence of the seneschal or Drost, built in 1374) by order of Prince-Elector Clemens August. It was to act as a store room for weapons, munitions, uniforms and battle equipment for soldiers studying at Meppen Fortress. In the 19th century the building was used for commercial purposes and survives today as a private residence, albeit with a number of structural alterations.
 The history of the Herrenmühle, a water mill on the Nordradde stream, goes back to the 16th century. It is used today for cultural events.
 Residential houses By contrast with Lingen, just a few kilometres away, the centre of Meppen has hardly any historic buildings. The town houses mainly consist of new buildings with a few 19th century brick houses. Of national significance is the Arenberg Rentei (Arenbergische Rentei) at No. 7, Obergerichtsstraße. The two-storey classical building with pilasters and a mansard roof was built as a residence in 1805 by August Reinking for the merchant, Ferdindand Frye, and his wife, Josefine Mulert. From 1835, it was used as a finance office (Rentei), it now serves as a town museum. Four years later, based on plans by the same architect, the so-called Heyl'sche Haus was built at No. 3, Emsstraße. The owner was the Duchy of Arenberg's privy councillor (Kammerrat), Anton Heyl. While the house itself was demolished in 1977 in favour of a bank, the adjoining hall, with its remarkable ornamentation, was kept and restored. Next to the huge bank, it looks rather lost. The town community centre, built in 1816 by physician, Nicholas Vagedes, not far from the town hall, has housed the town council since 1936. Amongst the few remaining timber-framed buildings are the single-storey houses No. 24, Kuhstraße and No. 12, Im Sack. The former dates essentially to the 16th century and is one of the oldest buildings in the town. It has been expanded and extended several times. No. 12 Im Sack, by contrast, was built in 1797 and still has a gateway to the hall or threshing floor (Dielentor). Today, it houses the offices of the newspaper and the senior citizens' volunteer agency.
 The Koppelschleuse locks, built between 1826 and 1830, have survived in its original state as part of the old Ems–Hase Canal.
 The Hölting Mill (Höltingmühle), a smock mill, was probably built in 1639 near Bockhorn in the county of Friesland. The mill was bought by the Hölting Citizens Preservation Society and re-erected during the town's 600th anniversary celebrations in 1959–60 on the tongue of land between the Dortmund–Ems Canal and the River Hase. Inside the mill today is a café, which is open during summer weekends. Civil ceremonies also take place in the mill.
 On the 131-metre-high cooling tower of the now closed Meppen-Hüntel Peak Load Gasworks is, according to the Guinness Book of Records, is the largest map of the world in the world. It was painted by the Swiss artist, Christoph Rihs.
 The Meppener Högerhaus, a former administrative building for the county of Meppen, (built 1936–1937) was designed by architect, Fritz Höger. Today a police station is housed in the double-winged, brick building on Bahnhofstraße, with its hipped roof. The entrance staircase on the southwest side is dominated by an archway.

Parks
 The former counterscarp of Meppen Fortress has survived and forms part of a park area with trees.

Natural monuments
 In the parish of Borken is the Borkener Paradies Nature Reserve, a historic wood pasture.

Population statistics
(*including the villages belonging to the town of Meppen)

Sport clubs
SV Meppen (football)
SV Union Meppen (football, tennis, gymnastics, volleyball, table tennis, athletics)

Twin towns – sister cities

Meppen is twinned with:
 Ostrołęka, Poland

Gallery

References

External links
 
Webcam (German)

Neuengamme concentration camp
Emsland